Sebastián Closter  (born 13 May 1989) is an Argentine volleyball player. He was part of the Argentina men's national volleyball team at the 2014 FIVB Volleyball Men's World Championship in Poland. He played with Club Ciudad de Bolívar.

Clubs
 Rosario Sonder (2009-2010)
 Sarmiento de Chaco (2010-2011)
 Sarmiento de Chaco (2011-2012)
 Puerto San Martin (2012-2013)
 Club Ciudad de Bolívar (2013-2014)
 Gigantes del sur-Neuquen (2014-2015)
 Chuamont - Francia (2015-2016)
 Chaumont - Francia (2016-2017)
 Rennes - Francia (2017-2018)
 Spacers Toulouse - Francia  (2018 - Actualidad)

National Team
Years-2014
 World League
 World Cup Polonia
 Years-2015
 World League
 Panamerican Games
 Claisficacion to the Japanese Cup
 Japanese Cup
 Classification Olympic Games

References

1989 births
Living people
Argentine men's volleyball players
Place of birth missing (living people)
Volleyball players at the 2015 Pan American Games
Pan American Games gold medalists for Argentina
Pan American Games medalists in volleyball
Medalists at the 2015 Pan American Games